Cork North was a parliamentary constituency represented in Dáil Éireann, the lower house of the Irish parliament or Oireachtas from 1923 to 1961. The constituency elected 3 (and sometimes 4) deputies (Teachtaí Dála, commonly known as TDs) to the Dáil, on the system of proportional representation by means of the single transferable vote (PR-STV).

History 
The constituency was created under the Electoral Act 1923, for the 1923 general election to Dáil Éireann, whose members formed the 4th Dáil. The constituency returned 3 Teachtaí Dála initially. The number of seats was increased to 4 for the 1937 general election but was reduced back to 3 for the 1948 general election.

It succeeded the constituency of Cork Mid, North, South, South East and West. It was abolished under the Electoral (Amendment) Act 1961, when it was replaced by the new constituency of Cork North-East and Cork Mid.

Boundaries 
It consisted of the county electoral areas of Kanturk and Macroom in the administrative county of Cork.

TDs

Elections

1957 general election

1954 general election

1951 general election

1948 general election

1944 general election

1943 general election

1938 general election

1937 general election

1933 general election

1932 general election

September 1927 general election

June 1927 general election

1923 general election 
Figures from the second count are not available.

See also 
Dáil constituencies
Politics of the Republic of Ireland
Historic Dáil constituencies
Elections in the Republic of Ireland

References

External links
Oireachtas Members Database

Dáil constituencies in the Republic of Ireland (historic)
Historic constituencies in County Cork
1923 establishments in Ireland
1961 disestablishments in Ireland
Constituencies established in 1923
Constituencies disestablished in 1961